Clinostigma is a genus of flowering plant in the Arecaceae (palm) family, native to various islands in the western Pacific. It contains the following species:

 Clinostigma carolinense (Becc.) H.E.Moore & Fosberg - Chuuk (Truk) in Micronesia
 Clinostigma collegarum J.Dransf. - Bismarck Archipelago
 Clinostigma gronophyllum H.E.Moore - Solomon Islands
 Clinostigma exorrhizum  (H.Wendl.) Becc. - Fiji
 Clinostigma haerestigma H.E.Moore - Solomon Islands
 Clinostigma harlandii Becc. - Vanuatu
 Clinostigma onchorhynchum Becc. - Samoa
 Clinostigma ponapense (Becc.) H.E.Moore & Fosberg - Pohnpei in Micronesia
 Clinostigma samoense H.Wendl. - Samoa
 Clinostigma savoryanum  (Rehder & E.H.Wilson) H.E.Moore & Fosberg - Arrack Tree - Ogasawara-shoto (Bonin Islands)
 Clinostigma warburgii Becc. - Samoa

References

 
Arecaceae genera
Flora of Oceania
Taxonomy articles created by Polbot